Dimension Jump is a roughly biennial convention organised by the official Red Dwarf fan club. Special guests typically include main and guest cast from the cult-favourite British television series as well as the show's co-creators and members of the production team.

The most recent convention, Dimension Jump XXI, was held at the Crowne Plaza Nottingham from 10–12 September 2021.

The date and location of the next convention has yet to be announced.

Past conventions

References

External links
 TORDFC's Dimension Jump website
 The Official Red Dwarf Fan Club (TORDFC) website

British fan conventions
Science fiction conventions in the United Kingdom
Red Dwarf